Fronten was a biweekly Norwegian newspaper.

History and profile
It was published by Nazi Eugen Nielsen from 1932 to 1940. In the beginning, it was published biweekly, but gradually this became more sporadic. Nielsen's primary interest, which was reflected in the publications, was attacking freemasonry.

Nielsen cooperated with the short-lived National Socialist Workers' Party of Norway (Norges Nasjonalsosialistiske Arbeiderparti), and was, therefore, critical to the rivalling national socialist party Nasjonal Samling. With Nasjonal Samling seizing power in Norway in the autumn of 1940, during the German occupation of Norway, Fronten eventually ceased to exist. Nielsen continued as an Anti-Masonry consultant for the Sicherheitsdienst.

References

1932 establishments in Norway
1940 disestablishments in Norway
Defunct newspapers published in Norway
Nazi newspapers
Norwegian-language newspapers
Publications established in 1932
Publications disestablished in 1940